Unique is the debut studio album by German recording artist Juliette Schoppmann. It was released by BMG-Ariola on February 9, 2004 in German-speaking Europe, following Schoppmann's participation in the first season of Deutschland sucht den Superstar, where she had finished second the previous year. Production on the album was chiefly handled by Peter Ries, while Stephen Lipson and Pete Martin contributed additional tracks. Songs were penned by Jörgen Elofsson, Toby Gad, Yak Bondy, Sheppard Solomon, Jade Anderson and Greg Wells among others.

Initially scheduled for a 2003 release, the album garnered a generally mixed reception from music critics upon its release and peaked at number 15 on the German Albums Chart. With a domestic sales total of 40,000 copies, it widely failed to satisfy the label's commercial expectations, resulting in the termination of Schoppmann's contract with the record company only four months after its release. Unique was preceded by three singles, including a cover version of the Jevetta Steele classic "Calling You", "Only Uh, Uh,..." and the ballad "I Still Believe".

Critical reception

Vicky Butscher from laut.de complimented the first half of the album but wrote that from "halfway point of the album, the tracks slow down noticeably. With "Paperball" Juliette returns to the love ballad universe. "Calling You" adds stupid lyrics. After all, er voice shows another facet – that of the unapproachable diva. You can't expect much new from Frau Schoppmann on the rest of the album. Unfortunately."

Track listing

Charts

References

External links

Official Homepage

2004 albums
19 Recordings albums